The 1950 Rhode Island Rams football team was an American football team that represented Rhode Island State College (later renamed the University of Rhode Island) as a member of the Yankee Conference during the 1950 college football season. In its first season under head coach Hal Kopp, the team compiled a 3–5 record (2–3 against conference opponents) and finished in third place in the conference. The team played its home games at Meade Stadium in Kingston, Rhode Island.

Schedule

References

Rhode Island State
Rhode Island Rams football seasons
Rhode Island State Rams football